Santa Luzia do Itanhy is a municipality located in the Brazilian state of Sergipe. Its population was 14,121 (2020) and its area is 330 km².

References

Municipalities in Sergipe